Jack Smith (born December 4, 1947) is a former American football defensive back who played one season with the Philadelphia Eagles of the National Football League. He was drafted by the Philadelphia Eagles in the sixth round of the 1971 NFL Draft. He first enrolled at the University of Memphis before transferring to Troy University. Smith attended Irwin County High School in Ocilla, Georgia.

References

External links
Just Sports Stats

Living people
1947 births
Players of American football from Georgia (U.S. state)
American football defensive backs
Memphis Tigers football players
Troy Trojans football players
Philadelphia Eagles players
People from Ocilla, Georgia